Toni Matti Kristian Kuusela (born 21 January 1994) is a Finnish athlete specializing in the javelin throw. He represented Finland at the 2020 Summer Olympics in the javelin throw.

Career
Kuusela competed at the 2019 Finnish Athletics Championships and won a bronze medal in the javelin throw. He again competed at the 2020 Finnish Athletics Championships and won a bronze medal in the javelin throw.

Kuusela represented Finland at the 2020 Summer Olympics in the javelin throw.

References

1994 births
Living people
Finnish male javelin throwers
Olympic athletes of Finland
Athletes (track and field) at the 2020 Summer Olympics
People from Vimpeli
Sportspeople from South Ostrobothnia
20th-century Finnish people
21st-century Finnish people